A culm is the aerial (above-ground) stem of a grass or sedge. It is derived from Latin  'stalk', and it originally referred to the stem of any type of plant. 

In horticulture or agriculture, it is especially used to describe the stalk or woody stems of bamboo, cane or grain grasses.

Malting
 
In the production of malted grains, the culms refer to the rootlets of the germinated grains. The culms are normally removed in a process known as "deculming" after kilning when producing barley malt, but form an important part of the product when making sorghum or millet malt. These culms are very nutritious and are sold off as animal feed.

References

Plant morphology